SC DHfK Leipzig Handball is a German handball team from Leipzig, Germany, that plays in the Handball-Bundesliga. It was one of the strongest GDR clubs in late 1950s and 1960s.

History
The SC DHfK Leipzig was founded in 1954 as a sports club of the Deutsche Hochschule für Körperkultur (German University for Physical Culture). During the time in the GDR, the club's handball section won six national championships (1959, 1960, 1961, 1962, 1965, 1966) and won the GDR Cup twice. In addition, it won the EHF Champions League in the 1965/1966 season and defeated Budapest Honvéd in the final on 22 April 1966 (16:14). In 1975, the authorities decided to dissolve the handball section and transfer all the players to another club in the city, SC Leipzig. On 30 June 1993, the handball department was re-established at SC DHfK. In June 1995, due to financial problems, the handball division was disbanded again. Finally, in 2007, the DHfK handball section was revived for the third time at the lowest level of German handball. It returned to the Handball-Bundesliga in the 2015–2016 season.

Crest, colours, supporters

Kit manufacturers

Kits

Sports hall information

Name: – Arena Leipzig
City: – Leipzig
Capacity: – 8000
Address: – Am Sportforum 2 04105 Leipzig, Germany

Accomplishments
EHF Champions League:
 : 1966
GDR Championship (Oberliga): 6
 : 1959, 1960, 1961, 1962, 1965, 1966, 1976, 1979
 : 1969
GDR Cup (FDGB-Pokal): 2
  Gold: 1971, 1972, 1982
2. Handball-Bundesliga: 1
: 2015

Team

Current squad
Squad for the 2022–23 season

Technical staff
 Head coach:  André Haber
 Assistant coach:  Miloš Putera
 Athletic Trainer:  Hagen Pietrek
 Physiotherapist:  Leon Brettschneider
 Club doctor:  Dr. Pierre Hepp

Transfers
Transfers for the 2023–24 season

Joining 
  Moritz Strosack (RW) (from  HBW Balingen-Weilstetten)
  Domenico Ebner (GK) (from  TSV Hannover-Burgdorf)

Leaving 
  Patrick Wiesmach (RW) (to  Aalborg Håndbold)
  Mohamed El-Tayar (GK) (to ?)

Previous squads

EHF ranking

Former club members

Notable former players

  Joel Birlehm (2019–2022)
  Simon Ernst (2021–)
  Rico Göde (2012–2014)
  Benjamin Herth (2016)
  Klaus Franke (1959–1971)
  Maximilian Janke (2015–2021)
  Yves Kunkel (2017–2018)
  Philipp Müller (2019–2021)
  Niclas Pieczkowski (2016–2021)
  Andreas Rojewski (2016–2019)
  Bastian Roscheck (2013–2021)
  Franz Semper (2013–2020)
  Christoph Steinert (2015–2017)
  Hans-Joachim Ursinus (1963–1974)
  Jens Vortmann (2016–2020)
  Luca Witzke (2019–)
  Philipp Weber (2013–2016, 2017–2021)
  Juan Pablo Fernández (2009–2010)
  Raul Santos (2018–2020)
  Šime Ivić (2021–)
  Lovro Jotić (2021–)
  Marko Mamić (2019–)
  Marino Marić (2022–)
  Pavel Prokopec (2012–2014)
  René Villadsen (2018–2019)
  Patrick Wiesmach (2018–)
  Mohamed El-Tayar (2022–)
  Joël Abati (2011)
  Viggó Kristjánsson (2019, 2022–)
  Aivis Jurdžs (2015–2019)
  Kristian Sæverås (2020–)
  Henrik Ruud Tovås (2013–2015)
  Maciej Gębala (2018–)
  Igor Lyovshin (2013)
  Goran Stojanović (2011)
  Alen Milosevic (2013–2022)
  Miloš Putera (2015–2019)
  Tobias Rivesjö (2016–2018)
  Oskar Sunnefeldt (2021–)

Former coaches

Notes
a. SC Leipzig

References

External links
 Official website

German handball clubs
Sport in Leipzig
Handball clubs established in 1954
1954 establishments in Germany
Handball-Bundesliga